Robert Grondelaers  (28 February 1933 – 22 August 1989) was a road cyclist from Belgium. He won the silver medal in the men's individual road race at the 1952 Summer Olympics in Helsinki, Finland. At the same tournament he claimed the title in the men's team road race, alongside André Noyelle and Lucien Victor. He was a professional rider from 1954 to 1962.

References

External links

1933 births
1989 deaths
Belgian male cyclists
Cyclists at the 1952 Summer Olympics
Olympic cyclists of Belgium
Olympic gold medalists for Belgium
Olympic silver medalists for Belgium
Olympic medalists in cycling
Cyclists from Limburg (Belgium)
Medalists at the 1952 Summer Olympics
People from Opglabbeek
20th-century Belgian people